This is a list of fictional dogs in animated film and is a subsidiary to the list of fictional dogs. It is a collection of various animated dogs in film.

Film (animation)

References

Lists of fictional canines
Fictional dogs